The men's individual time trial cycling event at the 1932 Olympic Games took place on August 4.  It was competed in a 100 km time trial format.

Results

Final

References

Road cycling at the 1932 Summer Olympics
Cycling at the Summer Olympics – Men's individual time trial